Sui Northern Gas Pipelines Limited Football Club,  commonly known as SNGPL, is a Pakistani professional football club based in Lahore, Pakistan which plays in the Pakistan Premier League, the top tier of Pakistani football.

They share a rivalry with Sui Southern Gas. The matches between two sides are known as the "Sui Derby".

History 
Sui Northern Gas debuted in the 2014 PFF league where they were drawn in Group E. They ended up on second place. In the 2015 NBP National Challenge Cup, the first Sui Derby between Sui Northern Gas and Sui Southern Gas was played, which Sui Northern Gas lost.

Rivalry 
The club shares rivalry with Karachi-based Sui Southern Gas known as "The Sui Derby", although none of the team is actually from the district of Sui but works as gas providers for different provinces, with Southern Sui Gas providing gas to Sindh, while Sui Northern Gas provides gas to Punjab.

The first ever derby was played on 21 April 2015 in 2015 NBP National Challenge Cup, where Sui Southern Gas defeated Sui Northern Gas 6–2, which till date is the biggest win, biggest loss and highest scoring match respectively. From later dates, derby was played on 12 December 2018 in 2018–19 Pakistan Premier League, where Sui Southern Gas won 2–1.

Results

Summary

Top scorers

Players

Squad

References 

Football in Lahore
Football clubs in Pakistan